The Mrs. William B. Astor House was a mansion on Fifth Avenue in the Upper East Side neighborhood of Manhattan, New York City. It was located at 840 and 841 Fifth Avenue, on the northeast corner of 65th Street, completed in 1896 and demolished around 1926.

History 
The house was originally built as a double mansion for Caroline Schermerhorn Astor, the widow of real estate heir William Backhouse Astor Jr., and her son John Jacob Astor IV. Construction started in 1894, and the house would transpire to be the largest of its kind on Fifth Avenue.

Caroline Astor lived in the northern half of the mansion (841 Fifth Avenue), while her son and his family lived in the southern half (840 Fifth Avenue). After Caroline Astor died in 1908, her son converted the double mansion into a single home for his family.

The mansion was designed by Richard Morris Hunt, who used the early French Renaissance architecture from the period Louis XII and Francois I, in imitation of a château in the French Louis XII Style, revival of the Château de Blois.

The house was the setting for many parties and was a New York City attraction. The ballroom could hold 1,200 people, compared with 400 at Mrs Astor’s previous mansion at 350 Fifth Avenue and 34th Street. 

The mansion was sold to real estate developer Benjamin Winter Sr. and demolished around 1926. Today, the temple of the Congregation Emanu-El of New York is located on the site.

Architecture

Ground floor 
The principal entrance to the house was through a domed vestibule, from which led a hall lined with busts of Mrs Astor’s ancestors. This room, in turn, gave access to the marble great hall, from where rose a large cantilevered  staircase. From the great hall, guests could enter the Adam style reception room, where they were received, on formal occasions, by their hostess standing beneath her own portrait by Carolus-Duran. At the end of the great hall was the entrance, flanked by two large vases and gold satin curtains, to the ballroom.

From the Great Hall, also led the Drawing Room, the walls of which were adorned with gilt-framed mirrors. The Drawing Room floor was laid with oriental carpets, large game rugs, and several others woven from feathers.

Also, off the Great Hall was the dining room, the black marble walls of which were hung with tapestries depicting hunting scenes. The room’s black-and-white marble-tiled floor was covered with polar-bear rugs, all centered on the marble stoned chimney piece, the mantle of which displayed vases. The Dining Room was lit by a large crystal chandelier hung with satin draperies.

From the dining room, was the breakfast room, which contained Mrs Astor’s tea-cup collection. This room also contained a small table covered with a red-and-white tablecloth and a small oriental vase filled with flowers.

Ballroom 
The ballroom was the largest room of the house, spanning the entire rear of the house and rising four stories to the roof. The ballroom doubled as the art gallery; the satin-paneled walls were hung with Mrs. Astor's famed art collection, while the parquet floors were covered with four massive red oriental rugs and 16 long narrow red Persian rugs. Also dotted around the floor were colorful peacock feathered woven rugs.

From the ceiling were suspended four large crystal chandeliers, each with several pearl strings linking from one to the other. At one end of the ballroom was a huge marble chimneypiece rising to the ceiling; this was decorated with two sculptures of male caryatids supporting a painted panel of a gala at the palace of Versailles. At the opposing end of the Ballroom, at second floor level, was a Minstrels' gallery, where a wall of Chinese screens blocked the musicians' view of the ballroom. In front of the balcony was Mrs. Astor's statue of Venus; around this were potted plants and a small marble waterfall. Before the fireplace stood Louis XVI style candelabra. Between the candelabra was a raised dais covered in fur blankets, on top of which was a red satin divan, upon which Caroline would sit. In between the divan were two small tables, on top of which were two marble horse heads. At the centre of the ballroom was placed a round, red velvet ottoman constructed around a large marble urn; matching this, arranged around the room were Canapés and chairs.

Second floor 
On the second floor was Mrs Astor’s bedroom, domed boudoir, dressing room, bathroom and closets. This floor also contained a guest suite and the linen closet.

The remaining floors contained the many guest and servants’ rooms.

See also
 List of Gilded Age mansions
 The Four Hundred (1892)

Further reading

References

External links 

 The Lost John Jacob Astor Mansion at 840 Fifth Avenue – Daytonian in Manhattan
 The Astor Double Mansion on Fifth Avenue – The Gilded Age Era
 Astor Mansion At 65th Street – The Gilded Age Era

Upper East Side
Fifth Avenue
Houses in Manhattan
Houses completed in 1893
Gilded Age mansions
Demolished buildings and structures in Manhattan
Astor family residences